Austrostipa pubescens, the spear grass, grows in heathland and sandy areas in eastern Australia.

The specific epithet pubescens translates to "softly hairy".

It first appeared in scientific literature in 1810 as Stipa pubescens in the Prodromus Florae Novae Hollandiae, authored by the prolific Scottish botanist, Robert Brown.

References

External links

pubescens
Bunchgrasses of Australasia
Flora of New South Wales
Flora of Queensland
Plants described in 1810